This is a list of schools in the Far North Queensland region of Queensland, Australia. The region's largest population centre is Cairns. It includes the local government areas of:

 Shire of Aurukun
 Shire of Burke
 Cairns Region
 Shire of Carpentaria
 Cassowary Coast Region
 Shire of Cook
 Shire of Croydon
 Aboriginal Shire of Doomadgee
 Shire of Douglas
 Shire of Etheridge
 Aboriginal Shire of Hope Vale
 Aboriginal Shire of Kowanyama
 Aboriginal Shire of Lockhart River
 Aboriginal Shire of Mapoon
 Shire of Mornington
 Aboriginal Shire of Napranum
 Shire of Mareeba
 Northern Peninsula Area Region
 Aboriginal Shire of Pormpuraaw
 Tablelands Region
 Shire of Torres
 Torres Strait Island Region
 Weipa Town
 Aboriginal Shire of Wujal Wujal
 Aboriginal Shire of Yarrabah

Prior to 2015, the Queensland education system consisted of primary schools, which accommodated students from kindergarten to Year 7 (ages 5–13), and high schools, which accommodate students from Years 8 to 12 (ages 12–18). However, from 2015, Year 7 became the first year of high school.

State schools

State primary schools

State high schools and colleges

Other state schools 

This includes special schools (schools for disabled children) and schools for specific purposes. Additionally to these, special education programs and units are located at many larger primary and high schools.

Defunct state schools

Private schools

Catholic schools
Catholic schools in the Cairns region are administered by Catholic Education Office, Roman Catholic Diocese of Cairns, and supported by the Queensland Catholic Education Commission, which is responsible for coordinating administration, curriculum and policy across the Catholic school system. Preference for enrolment is given to Catholic students from the parish or local area, although non-Catholic students are admitted if room is available.

Independent schools

Defunct private schools

See also
 List of schools in Queensland

References

External links
 Directory of Schools (Department of Education and Training - Queensland Government)
, a directory of Government schools in Queensland. (Department of Education and Training – Queensland Government)
 Catholic Education Office, Cairns
 About Independent schools at Independent Schools Queensland.

Far North Queensland